3100 series or 3100 class train may refer to:

Japanese train types 
 Hakone Tozan 3100 series, an electric multiple unit train
 Hankyu 3100 series, an electric multiple unit train
 Keisei 3100 series, an electric multiple unit train
 Meitetsu 3100 series, an electric multiple unit train included
 Odakyu 3100 series NSE, an electric multiple unit train

Other 
 CP Class 3100
 GWR 3100 Class
 MRTC 3100 class, a light rail vehicle
 Queensland Railways 3100/3200 class

See also
 3100 (disambiguation)